Y: The Last Man is an American post-apocalyptic drama television series developed by Eliza Clark based on the comic book series of the same name by Brian K. Vaughan and Pia Guerra. In the series, a mysterious cataclysmic event simultaneously kills every mammal with a Y chromosome—except for Yorick Brown–and follows him as he traverses the new world.

The series began development at FX in October 2015, with a pilot ordered and filmed in 2018. A first season was greenlit in 2019 with Clark replacing original showrunners Michael Green and Aida Mashaka Croal. Filming began in 2020, with several casting changes, including the lead role of Yorick. It premiered on September 13, 2021, on FX on Hulu, and stars Diane Lane, Ashley Romans, Ben Schnetzer, Olivia Thirlby, and Amber Tamblyn. It received generally positive reviews from critics, but was cancelled in October 2021, after one season.

Premise
Y: The Last Man takes place in a post-apocalyptic world where a mysterious cataclysmic event simultaneously killed every mammal with a Y chromosome but for one man – Yorick Brown (Ben Schnetzer) – and his male pet monkey Ampersand. The series follows Yorick as he traverses the new world, as its survivors struggle with their losses and attempt to restore world society—led by Yorick's mother, who is the new U.S. President, Jennifer Brown (Diane Lane).

Gender effects
In the original comic book series, every animal with a Y chromosome instantaneously dies at the same time, including most mammals. (Birds, reptiles, amphibians, fish, and invertebrates are unaffected because they mostly use different sex chromosomes.) While transgender people did not feature heavily in the original comic, it was mentioned that trans men survived due to not having Y chromosomes.

The producers aimed to update and expand on the ramifications of this, to reflect changing societal attitudes toward gender in the almost two decades since the comic began. The showrunners specified that trans women with Y chromosomes also died, as well as women with androgen insensitivity who were unaware they possessed Y chromosomes. The showrunners also added a trans male character to the regular cast (Sam Jordan, played by Elliot Fletcher), who does not have a direct counterpart in the original comic, to expand on this world-building.

Speaking at the August 2021 TCA panel, showrunner Eliza Clark said: "Yorick's maleness is not what sets him apart in this world — it's his Y chromosome that sets him apart. Gender is diverse and chromosomes are not equal to gender. And so, in our world — in the world of the television show — every living mammal with a Y chromosome dies. Tragically, that includes many women; it includes non-binary people; it includes intersex people ... We are making a show that affirms that trans women are women, trans men are men, non-binary people are non-binary, and that is part of the richness of the world we get to play with."

Cast member Fletcher said that "In this world post the event, gender is somewhat irrelevant. I think one of the hilarious things about this show is that post the event, Yorick can walk around without a mask on because he's assumed to be trans, rather than pre-the-event, people are assumed to be cisgender. And so, I just think it flips the traditional idea of gender completely on its head, and so I was very comfortable joining a project that knew that ahead of time and committed to it fully."

Societal effects
Showrunner Eliza Clark explained that the writing team tried to analyze the logical ripple effects of what would happen if all people with Y chromosomes died instantaneously. She said she was surprised at how even by 2020, there is still a large gender disparity in many aspects of essential infrastructure, ranging from the electrical power grid to something as basic as trucking to keep supply lines functional: "Basically what I learned is that our entire economy runs on trucks. So, if you're living in a city, you know when you go to a grocery store that grocery store needs two deliveries a day to be stocked for the number of people who are shopping [at] it, and they don't have storage. I think 5% of truck drivers are women."

Clark went on to say, that while all people with Y chromosomes are suddenly killed off, essentially removing the gender binary divide among the survivors, the resulting society that develops over the course of the series is not egalitarian. Other social divisions remain based on race, sexual orientation, politics, or wealth.

Governmental effects

In the United States, Republican president Ted Campbell dies along with his vice president, most of both houses of Congress, and six out of nine Supreme Court Justices (including men as well as women who died in accidents resulting from the event). The presidential line of succession is decimated, losing the Speaker of the House, President pro tempore of the Senate, and (seemingly) all Cabinet officials. The surviving congresswomen hastily elevate the Chair of the House Intelligence Committee (Jennifer Brown, a Democrat) as Speaker, and in turn (within one hour) swear the new Speaker in as President.

President Campbell's politically active daughter Kimberly Campbell Cunningham begins rallying the surviving Republican congresswomen, urging that they were the lawfully elected party in power before the die-off, while Brown's new Executive branch wasn't elected but came into power through line of succession. There was also a higher ratio of female Democratic members than Republicans, at least temporarily tipping the balance in the surviving government as well.

Only two women were Cabinet heads – but Secretary of Education Abbott was born in Antigua and thus not eligible. The only eligible Cabinet head was Regina Oliver, who was visiting Israel at the time of the event and presumed dead. Later, however, it is discovered that Oliver survived: she was injured in a building collapse and left in a coma for several weeks, but recovers. Oliver is described even by moderate Republicans as a far-right radical who President Campbell only appointed to a minor Cabinet position as a concession to far-right swing voters. Even Kimberly Campbell's surviving Republican caucus considers Oliver a fringe lunatic, leaving them conflicted about pushing for her to replace Brown as president.

The effect of the die-off on other countries isn't discussed in detail in the first season, in part because the world has been thrown into such chaos that even Jennifer Brown's fragile emergency administration still doesn't know. Other countries with few or no women in leadership positions fared much worse than the United States, which was itself crippled. In the third episode, it is briefly mentioned that the Russian government tried to spread propaganda that their male leadership had survived in isolation, but when rioters stormed the Kremlin and exposed this to be a lie, the Russian government collapsed.

Cast and characters

Main

 Diane Lane as Jennifer Brown, Yorick and Hero's mother, and a Democratic U.S. Congresswoman who is elevated to the office of President. She was previously the Chair of the House Intelligence Committee.
 Ashley Romans as Sarah Burgin / Agent 355, a member of the secretive Culper Ring organisation, Yorick's bodyguard, and a Secret Service agent.
 Ben Schnetzer as Yorick Brown, an amateur escape artist and now the last known cisgender male human left alive; his pet capuchin monkey named Ampersand is the only other surviving male mammal.
 Olivia Thirlby as Hero Brown, Yorick's sister, a paramedic.
 Juliana Canfield as Beth DeVille, Yorick's former girlfriend.
 Elliot Fletcher as Sam Jordan, a trans man and Hero's best friend.
 Marin Ireland as Nora Brady / Victoria, a former press advisor to President Ted Campbell.
 Amber Tamblyn as Kimberly Campbell Cunningham, daughter of deceased President Ted Campbell.
 Diana Bang as Dr. Allison Mann, a Harvard University geneticist.

Recurring

 Jess Salgueiro as Christine Flores, Chief of Staff to President Brown
 Laura de Carteret as Lisa Murray, a former advisor for the Campbell Administration assisting President Brown
 Yanna McIntosh as General Peggy Reed
 Paris Jefferson as Marla Campbell, wife and former First Lady to the deceased U.S. President Ted Campbell.
 Jennifer Wigmore as Regina Oliver, Secretary of Veterans Affairs and the next in line of succession for U.S. President before Jennifer Brown, who was believed to be dead.
 Missi Pyle as Roxanne, the leader of the Daughters of the Amazon, a survivalist cult.

Guest
 Paul Gross as Ted Campbell, the Republican U.S. President who is killed in the global die-off.
 Kristen Gutoskie as Sonia, a former convict living as part of the Marrisville community.

Episodes

Production

Development

In October 2015, it was reported that FX had begun development on a television series adaptation of Brian K. Vaughan and Pia Guerra's comic book series Y: The Last Man. Vaughan was set to produce alongside Nina Jacobson and Brad Simpson. Production companies involved with the series were expected to include Color Force and FX Productions.

In November 2016, it was announced that Michael Green would serve as showrunner for the potential series in addition to writing a pilot script with Vaughan. In January 2017, it was reported that FX was expecting to receive the script in the next few months. In May 2017, it was clarified that Green had solely written the script and that Vaughan had read and liked it. In July 2017, it was confirmed that FX had received a draft of the script from Green, that they had liked it, and that discussions over the potential series were ongoing. In January 2018, FX CEO John Landgraf commented on the series' status during the annual Television Critics Association winter press tour saying, "[We feel] pretty optimistic, not quite at a final decision point. But we got a script I really like, a draft we really like recently." Landgraf went on to comment that Green was now available for the series following his departure from American Gods.

In April 2018, it was announced that FX had given the production a pilot order. Green was expected to co-showrun the series with Aida Mashaka Croal, both of whom were also set to executive produce alongside Melina Matsoukas, Jacobson, Simpson, and Vaughan. Matsoukas was also slated to direct the pilot episode. In February 2019, it was announced at the Television Critics Association's annual winter press tour that the production had been given a series order for a first season, expected to premiere in 2020.

In April 2019, Green and Croal exited the series, with creative differences cited. In June 2019, it was announced that Eliza Clark would be replacing Croal and Green as the showrunner. In February 2020, it was concluded that Clark, Nina Jacobson and Brad Simpson of Color Force, and Vaughan would executive produce. Matsoukas also serves as executive producer, as does Mari Jo Winkler-Ioffreda. Nellie Reed serves as producer. In May 2020, it was announced that the show's title had been changed from simply Y to Y: The Last Man. In June 2020, it was announced that the series would premiere FX on Hulu instead of FX's linear cable network. In October 2020, it was announced that along with serving as showrunner, Eliza Clark would also be writing the first two episodes, with Louise Friedberg directing those episodes. FX also announced that the entire first season would be directed by women. The series premiered with its first three episodes on September 13, 2021, with subsequent episodes released weekly.

Casting
In July 2018, it was announced that Diane Lane, Barry Keoghan, Imogen Poots, Lashana Lynch, Juliana Canfield, Marin Ireland, Amber Tamblyn, and Timothy Hutton had been cast in the pilot's main roles. In February 2020, it was announced that Keoghan was no longer portraying Yorick and that a new actor would be cast. Later that month, Ben Schnetzer was cast in the role of Yorick. In March 2020, it was announced that Elliot Fletcher had been cast in the series regular role of Sam Jordan, Hero's best friend. In October 2020, Ashley Romans and Olivia Thirlby joined the cast to replace Lynch and Poots as Agent 355 and Hero Brown, respectively. It was also announced that Hutton was no longer part of the cast list due to series restructuring, and his role would be played by Paul Gross. It was later announced that Diana Bang had been cast as Doctor Allison Mann.

Filming
Principal photography for the pilot originally commenced in August 2018.

Filming locations reportedly included Pearl River, New York. In February 2020, it was revealed that production for the series was to begin in April. Production was suspended due to the COVID-19 pandemic. Filming for the series began in Mississauga, Canada in October 2020, and concluded in July 2021.

Cancellation
On October 17, 2021, FX on Hulu canceled the series after one season. However, Clark was committed to finding a new outlet or network for the series to continue. The reason for cancellation was not due to low viewing figures, but for budgetary reasons. Due to the showrunner and cast changes as well as the COVID-19 pandemic-related production shutdowns, FX had to pay to extend the contracts for the actors. The contracts were set to expire on October 15, 2021, and FX ultimately decided against spending $3 million to further extend them. On January 14, 2022, Clark revealed that the series was permanently canceled as it failed to find a new network.

Reception

Audience viewership 
According to TV Time, Y: The Last Man was the second most anticipated new television series of September 2021. According to Whip Media, Y: The Last Man was the ninth most watched original television series across all platforms in the United States, during the week of September 19, 2021.

Critical response
The review aggregator website Rotten Tomatoes reports a 76% approval rating with an average rating of 6.9/10, based on 58 reviews. The website's critics consensus reads, "Y: The Last Man makes a few key updates to its source material and boasts a number of incredible performances, but this highly anticipated adaptation can't help but feel like a bit of a letdown in a world full of dystopian realities." Metacritic gave the series a weighted average score of 63 out of 100 based on reviews from 26 critics, indicating "generally favorable reviews".

Judy Berman of Time wrote, "Y: The Last Man improves so much over the course of its first six episodes that its potential feels limitless. If audiences can weather its apocalypse, the show might well become something special by the time rebuilding commences." Alan Sepinwall of Rolling Stone gave it 3 out of 5 stars and wrote, "A solid but frustrating show that frequently struggles to embrace what's unique about itself." Darren Franich of Entertainment Weekly gave it a "C" grade and wrote, "there's a basic lack of flair in the storytelling" and "even if you never read the comic book, you've seen this all before." From The Guardian, Joel Golby notes that its "...telling good, human stories against a backdrop of unbelievable sci-fi architecture makes for something utterly gripping" while Lucy Mangan dismissed the series as "a stale, male manbaby mess." Kelly Lawler of USA Today called it a "flawed but vibrant epic" and stated that the show "doesn't quite achieve the mastery and impact of its source material but is certainly a worthy adaptation." Clint Worthington of Consequence considered the series "dated and languid". Caroline Framke of Variety felt that "the real undoing of Y: The Last Man, at least in the first six episodes provided to press ahead of the show's premiere, is that it takes itself too seriously to allow for many other emotions beyond 'desperate' and 'grieving'."

Accolades

References

External links
 
 Y: The Last Man on Hulu
 

2020s American drama television series
2020s American science fiction television series
2021 American television series debuts
2021 American television series endings
Dystopian television series
English-language television shows
Post-apocalyptic television series
FX on Hulu original programming
Single-gender worlds
Television shows based on DC Comics
Television series by 20th Century Fox Television
Television productions suspended due to the COVID-19 pandemic
Alternate history television series